Homère Clément (12 July 1852 – 8 November 1923) was a doctor and radical-socialist politician, born in La Trinité, Martinique. He who served in the French National Assembly as deputy of Martinique from 1902-1906. He died in Paris, aged 71.

References 

Homère Clément page on the French National Assembly website

1852 births
1923 deaths
People from La Trinité, Martinique
Martiniquais politicians
Radical Party (France) politicians
Members of the 8th Chamber of Deputies of the French Third Republic